Dichodontocis is a genus of tree-fungus beetle in the family Ciidae

Species
 Dichodontocis uncinatus Kawanabe, 1994

References

Ciidae genera